Gammel Strand 38 is a Neoclassical property overlooking Slotsholmen Canal in the Olt Town of Copenhagen, Denmark. The building was listed in the Danish registry of protected buildings and places in 1945.

History

18th century

The property was listed as No. 10 in Strand Quarter in Copenhagen's first cadastre of 1689. It was at that time owned by master barber Christian Franch. The property was again listed as No. 10 in the new cadastre of 1756 and was then owned by one glass merchant Meer.

At the time of the 1787 census, No. 10 was home to five households. Johanne Magrete Bautler, a distiller, resided in the building with his wife Anne Dorthe Linck and their five children (aged seven to 20). Johanne Magrete Bautler, an 82-year-old widow, resided in the building with her 40-year-old daughter Johanne Magrete Bautler and 18-year-old nephew Søren Lucke. Adam Gottlob Lowsow, bell-ringer at the Synagogue, resided in the building with his wife Dorothea Sophia Krog and their eight children. Ole Wærn, the proprietor of a tavern in the basement, resided in the associated dwelling with his wife Sidse Maria, their six children (aged one to 15) and one maid.

The property was destroyed in the Copenhagen Fire of 1756, together with most of the other buildings in the area. The current building on the site was built in 1798–1799 for coppersmith Christian Petersen.

19th century
At the time of the 1801 census, No, 10 was home to four households. Christian Petersen resided in one of the apartments with his wife Marie Elisabeth Petersen, four coppersmiths, four apprentices, two maids and one lodger. Gustav Proscht. a vlerk, resided in another apartment with his wife Ane Catharine Proscht and their five children (aged four to 17). Frideriche Sophie Storph, a 75-year-old widow, resided in a third apartment with two maids. Jean Jaques Christophlesen Battier (Johan Jacob Battier, 1773-1805), a student, son of Christoph Battier (1733-1786), resided in the building with his wife Margrethe Thomsen Mitchell, their one-year-old son Frideriche Sophie Battier and one maid. Ludvig Meyer (1780-1854), a professor, resided on the second floor with his wife Charlotte Platou and one maid.

The property was listed as No. 9 in the new cadastre of 1806. It was at that time still owned by Christian Petersen.

The author Thomasine Gyllembourg and her son Johan Ludvig Heiberg were among the residents of the building in 1817–18. 

At the time of the 1840 census, No. 9 was home to five households. A restaurant had opened on the ground floor. Jørgen Fischer, the restaurateur, resided in the associated dwelling with his wife	Maria Funch, their three children (aged nine to 14) and one maid. Jens Larsen, a merchant (grosserer), resided in the basement with his wife Ellen Chatrine Kiøbenhavn, their two daughters (aged 13 and 15) and one maid. Johannes Hansen, a bookkeeper at Tallotteriet with title of kammerråd, resided on the first floor with his wife Christine Fischer, their 21-year-old daughter Sophie Magdelene Hansen and one maid. Janette Petersen, a 50-year-old "institute manager" (institutbestyrerinde), resided on the third floor with four girls in the age range 12-15, a housekeeper and a maid.

left|

The banker G. A. Gedalia (1816–1892) resided in one of the apartments in 1852–53 and again in the years around 1886.

The property was home to 23 residents at the time of the 1860 census.

Niels Pedersen, a fishmonger, resided on the ground floor with his wife Dorthea Pedersen, their two children (aged two and four) and one lodger. Theis Hein, a courier at Rigsdagen, resided on the first floor with his wife Ane Margrethe Hein, their 18-year-old daughter Hulda Hein and two lodgers. Petrea Sophie Juul,widow of a kammerråd, resided on the second floor with one maid. Peder Gerhar Baagøe, a music teacher, resided on the third floor with his wife Thora Mathile Baagøe f. Bierregaard and their two children (aged one and three). Inger Marie Borup (née Sørensen), the proprietor of the tavern in the basement, resided in the associated dwelling with her 16-year-old daughter Conrad Sophus Borup and five lodgers.

Anthon Berg (1829–1916) resided in one of the apartments from 1884 to 1887. He started his production of chocolate in the ground floor on 7 April 1884.

Architecture
The building consists of four storeys over a raised cellar and is just three bays wide. The ground floor is clad in painted wood with pilasters between the windows while the three upper floors stand in undressed brick. Between the central windows of the first and second floor is a recessed rectangular frieze with vase and festoons. The facade is finished by a plastered dentilated cornice. A seven bays long side wing projects from the rear side of the building. The building was listed in the Danish registry of protected buildings and places in 1945.

Today
Krogs Fiskerestaurant, a fish restaurant, is based in the ground floor.

References

External links

 Krogs Fiskerestaurant

Listed residential buildings in Copenhagen
Residential buildings completed in 1801
1801 establishments in Denmark